Eleven ships of the Royal Navy have borne the name HMS Plover, after the species of bird, the Plover:

  was a 26-gun ship, previously the Dutch Morgen Star. She was captured in 1652 and either sunk in action in 1653 or sold in 1657.
  was an 18-gun sloop launched in 1796 and sold in 1819.
  was a 10-gun  launched in 1821 that became a Post Office Packet Service packet, sailing out of Falmouth, Cornwall. She was sold in 1841.
  was a survey cutter, previously the civilian Bentinck. She was purchased in 1842 and sold in 1854.  See William Pullen.
  was an  wooden screw gunboat launched in 1855 and sunk in 1859.
  was a  gunvessel launched in 1860 and sold into civilian service in 1865, being renamed Hawk.
  was a wooden screw gunvessel launched in 1867 and sold for breaking up in 1885.
  was a composite screw gunboat launched in 1888. She was used as a boom defence vessel from 1904 and was sold in 1927.
  was an  launched in 1916 and sold in 1921.
  was a minelayer launched in 1937 and sold in 1969.
 HMS Plover (P239) was a  patrol vessel launched in 1983.

Royal Navy ship names